MTV School Attack is a television show in Korea where pop stars perform surprise concerts at junior high and high schools in South Korea.

Format
A typical episode of MTV School Attack begins with the host school summoning all students to an assembly. An administrator or teacher will then give a lecture which bores students. However a siren will then start blaring while a School Attack banner is unveiled. The performers will then emerge from behind a stage or enter the facility and begin performing a medley of songs to the delight of students.

Performers who have appeared on School Attack
Big Bang
F.T. Island
Koyote
Lee Hyori
Rain
Se7en
SG Wannabe
Super Junior
SHINee
TVXQ
2PM
2NE1
GOT7
NCT
Monsta X
NU'EST W
Pristin V
Triple H
Red Velvet
Block B
Wanna One
Mamamoo
Twice
iKon
Highlight

International Versions 

MTV
South Korean musical television series
2007 South Korean television series debuts
Year of television series debut missing
Year of television series ending missing